Jerome Martin Koosman (born December 23, 1942) is an American former professional baseball pitcher. Koosman is best known as a member of the Miracle Mets team that won the 1969 World Series.

New York Mets

Rookie year
Koosman was discovered by the son of a Shea Stadium usher, John Lucchese, who caught Koosman when he pitched in the United States Army at Fort Bliss, Texas. The Mets offered Koosman a contract after his discharge from the military. Koosman was about to be cut from the Mets in 1966, when Joe McDonald, the assistant farm director, requested Koosman be retained at least until his first payday, as he owed the Mets money they had wired him after his car broke down en route to spring training.

He posted a 19–12 record with seven shutouts, 178 strikeouts, and a 2.08 earned run average. The wins, shutouts, and ERA set franchise records, breaking those set by teammate Tom Seaver the year prior. Koosman also made the first of two All-Star teams in his career. The National League won the game 1–0 (to date, the only All-Star Game to end in a 1–0 score) in the "Year of the Pitcher." Koosman pitched a scoreless ninth for the save, striking out Carl Yastrzemski for the final out. Koosman was named to the 1968 Topps All-Star Rookie Roster and finished runner-up to Johnny Bench for the National League Rookie of the Year honors.

The Miracle Mets

In  Koosman posted a 17–9 record with a 2.28 ERA and 180 strikeouts in another All-Star season. That year, he was a member of the Mets team that unexpectedly won the National League East title (both leagues had split into two divisions after expanding from ten teams to 12) after finishing last in five of their first seven seasons, as well as trailing the Chicago Cubs for much of the season, and by as many as 9 games. After Koosman lost to the Houston Astros to fall to 9–8, he won eight of his final nine decisions.

In Game Two of the NLCS against the Atlanta Braves, Koosman was shelled for six runs in 4 innings (including a Hank Aaron three-run homer). The Mets won 11–6, however, then won the next game to complete the series sweep.

Koosman was the pitching star of the 1969 World Series against the Baltimore Orioles. After Seaver was defeated in Game One, Koosman, leading 1–0, held the Orioles hitless until Paul Blair singled to lead off the bottom of the seventh inning, eventually scoring on Brooks Robinson's only hit in 19 Series' at-bats. The Mets regained the lead in the top of the ninth; Koosman got two outs in the bottom of the frame, then walked the next two batters. He was relieved by Ron Taylor, who induced Robinson to ground out to end the game.

With the Series shifting from Memorial Stadium to Shea Stadium for the next three games, the Mets won Games Three and Four, and Koosman took the mound for Game Five. He fell behind 3–0 in the third inning after giving up home runs to his mound opponent, Dave McNally, and Frank Robinson. The Mets, however, cut into the Oriole lead on Donn Clendenon's two-run home run in the sixth, then tied the game in the seventh on a homer by Al Weis, who had hit only six career homers at that point—none of which had been in a home game. The Mets scored two runs in the eighth to take the lead, and after walking Frank Robinson to lead off the ninth, Koosman retired the next three hitters to end the game and complete the Mets’ improbable World Series win.

Game ball for game 5
After catching Davey Johnson's fly ball for the final out of the World Series, left fielder Cleon Jones gave the game ball to Koosman. That ball, as well as the game ball from Game 2, was stored in a safe in Koosman's residence. In the early 1990s, Koosman sold the ball from Game 5. The Game 5 ball's current whereabouts are unknown.

"Ya Gotta Believe!" and "It Ain’t Over 'til It's Over"

In  Koosman posted a 12–7 record with a 3.14 ERA. In  he went 5–0 in his first six starts, but ended the season 14–15. In late August/early September of that year, he set a Mets' record by pitching 31 consecutive scoreless innings (R. A. Dickey broke his mark by pitching 32 consecutive scoreless innings in ). As in 1969, the Mets unexpectedly won the NL East title—once again overtaking the Cubs, whom they had trailed this time by as many as nine games—on the strength of the pitching of Koosman, Seaver and the previous year's NL Rookie of the Year, Jon Matlack. This comeback gave rise to two slogans: Tug McGraw's "Ya Gotta Believe!" and manager Yogi Berra's "It ain’t over 'til it's over."

In Game Three of the NLCS against the Cincinnati Reds, Koosman pitched a complete game for a 9–2 victory in a game that was headlined by Pete Rose's altercation with Mets' shortstop Bud Harrelson. The victory gave the Mets a 2–1 lead in the NLCS; they won the pennant two days later in five games.

Koosman was the winning pitcher in Game Five of the World Series against the defending champion Oakland Athletics, holding Oakland scoreless for 6 innings. This victory gave the Mets a 3–2 lead in the Series; however, Oakland won the next two games to repeat as World Champions.

Later Met years

In  he had possibly his best season ever, establishing career bests with 21 wins (against 10 losses) and 200 strikeouts. He also finished runner-up to Randy Jones for the National League Cy Young Award. In , the Mets traded Seaver to the Reds. The remainder of the team deteriorated, especially Koosman who slumped to 8–20, finishing tied with Phil Niekro for most losses in the NL. After a 3–15 season in  Koosman, seeing no imminent improvement to the team, was traded to the Minnesota Twins at his request. His departure left Ed Kranepool as the last remaining member of the 1969 Miracle Mets (although Seaver returned to the Mets for the 1983 season).

The Mets acquired Jesse Orosco in the trade that sent Koosman to the Twins. (Orosco had been the player to be named later who went to the Mets to complete the deal, which had been made two months earlier, in December 1978.)

Later career

On August 30, less than a month after the 1981 players' strike ended, the Twins traded Koosman to the Chicago White Sox. He went 4–13 on the season, again finishing tied for his league lead in losses.

In the latter year, the White Sox won the American League West title to make their first post-season appearance since the 1959 World Series; however, the Baltimore Orioles defeated the White Sox in four games. After the season Koosman was traded to the Philadelphia Phillies; he went 14–15 in  his last productive season.

On April 13, 1984 Koosman gave up a double to Pete Rose for his 4000th hit.

With 222 wins, he is tied (with Hooks Dauss) at #72 on the all-time win list. He ended his career with a 222–209 record and a 3.36 ERA in 612 games. He struck out 2,556 batters in 3,839 innings pitched.

Koosman has the third most wins in Mets history (140) behind Tom Seaver (198) and Dwight Gooden (157).

He attended the 40th anniversary reunion of the 1969 Miracle Mets at Citi Field on August 22, 2009.

The Mets retired Koosman's number 36 on August 28, 2021, making him the third Mets player (after Tom Seaver and Mike Piazza) to have his number retired. Koosman has since been joined by Keith Hernandez and Willie Mays in getting their numbers retired

Federal tax conviction

In May 2009, Koosman pleaded guilty to misdemeanor federal tax evasion after failing to pay up to $90,000 in federal income taxes for 2002, 2003, and 2004. Koosman admitted to being "suckered" by anti-tax rhetoric. On September 3, 2009, he was sentenced to six months in prison.  He was released from Federal Prison Camp, Duluth on June 30, 2010.

See also
List of Major League Baseball career wins leaders
List of Major League Baseball career strikeout leaders

References and notes

External links

Jerry Koosman at SABR (Baseball BioProject)
Jerry Koosman at Baseball Almanac
Jerry Koosman at Baseball Biography
Jerry Koosman at Ultimate Mets Database

National League All-Stars
Chicago White Sox players
Minnesota Twins players
New York Mets players
Philadelphia Phillies players
Major League Baseball pitchers
1942 births
Living people
People from Appleton, Minnesota
Baseball players from Minnesota
Greenville Mets players
Williamsport Mets players
Auburn Mets players
Jacksonville Suns players
American people convicted of tax crimes
American sportspeople convicted of crimes
Prisoners and detainees of the United States federal government